Glinica  is a village in the administrative district of Gmina Ciasna, within Lubliniec County, Silesian Voivodeship, in southern Poland.

The village has a population of 984.

References

Glinica